OnTheMarket.com is a British property search portal that launched in January 2015. 

The key proposition of the business is the creation of an agent-backed, full-scale property portal by offering a premier search experience to consumers whilst charging sustainably fair prices to estate and letting agents and house builder customers.

OnTheMarket.com (OnTheMarket) is run by OnTheMarket plc, the majority estate agent and letting agent-owned company which is listed on the AIM market on the London Stock Exchange.

Operations 
As a leading UK property search website, OnTheMarket displays hundreds of thousands of properties that are available for sale or to rent every month. In addition, OnTheMarket also displays thousands of new properties for sale or to rent every month, 24 hours or more before they appear on Rightmove or Zoopla to give serious property seekers an edge in their property search. These properties are labelled as Only With Us on the site and feature a countdown clock to show how long there is until these properties will also be made available to Rightmove or Zoopla. OnTheMarket also displays properties which are totally exclusive to their site, these properties are labelled as Only With Us but don’t feature the countdown clock.

As well as UK residential properties for sale and to rent, OnTheMarket also displays thousands of UK commercial properties for sale and to rent as well as overseas properties available for sale. 

Following a full rebrand in December 2021, OnTheMarket has upgraded its website to improve user experience and functionality with the inclusion of tools such as Wish List, which allows home movers to specify features they’d like in their next property in order to filter search results, and Ask The Agent which allows users to register their interest in homes not yet advertised for sale.  

Users can see properties located on Google Maps as part of property listings and HM Land Registry data is available to provide searchers with sold house prices.

History 
In 2013, estate agents including Knight Frank, Savills, Strutt & Parker, Chestertons, Douglas & Gordon and Glentree Estates founded Agents' Mutual Ltd. The company launched its portal OnTheMarket.com in January 2015.

OnTheMarket members signed up to a 'one other portal' rule as a measure they saw as necessary for the portal to enter the UK market, which was overwhelmingly dominated by two players.

On 5 July 2017 the Competition Appeal Tribunal ruled OnTheMarket.com's one other portal rule - which stipulates estate agent members can list on a maximum of one other competing portal - is not anti-competitive. This judgement was supported in January 2019 by the Court of Appeal.

In September 2017, Members of Agents’ Mutual voted 89% in favour of demutualisation of the company to introduce a new parent company – OnTheMarket plc – in preparation for the admission to the AIM market of the London Stock Exchange.

On 9 February 2018 OnTheMarket plc was admitted to the AIM market of the London Stock Exchange.

On 14th December 2020, Jason Tebb was appointed as the new Chief Executive. His background of 20+ years in property makes him the only CEO of a major property portal who has previously been an estate agent.

Within the first 12 months of his tenure, CEO Jason Tebb oversaw the implementation of a new website design, logo and branding which launched in December 2021, encompassing the largest upgrade to OnTheMarket’s features and functionality since the original site was launched in 2015. The new-look portal features additional products, services and functionality to support OnTheMarket’s strategy of building a differentiated, tech-enabled property business and has been developed to provide the most relevant experience for consumers aimed at increasing engagement with serious and active property-seekers.

See also
FindaProperty
Rightmove
Zoopla
Primelocation

References

External links

OnTheMarket Expert

Property services companies of the United Kingdom
Property companies based in London
British real estate websites